The Long Island Shakespeare Festival, co-founded by Charles Townsend Wittreich Jr., is sponsored by Suffolk County Community College to provide Long Island residents and visitors quality professional theatre with emphasis on plays by William Shakespeare. In addition, it serves as a transition for student theatre artists and artisans from Long Island into the business of theatre.  Former and current Long Island residents who have created careers in theatre return to the area to perform, direct or design. The Long Island Shakespeare Festival uses the production facilities of the Theatre Training Program at Suffolk Community College on Long Island, New York. The Festival, to foster the appreciation of Shakespearean theatre, makes each showing free of charge.

Past Productions
Romeo and Juliet
The Taming of the Shrew
The Comedy of Errors
Macbeth
Twelfth Night, or What You Will
As You Like It
A Midsummer Night's Dream
Much Ado About Nothing
The Tempest
The Merry Wives of Windsor
Much Ado About Nothing
King Henry V
Macbeth
As You Like It
Three Musketeers

LISF Alumni

References

External links
Official Long Island Shakespeare Festival Website
Suffolk County Community College

Tourist attractions on Long Island
Shakespeare festivals in the United States
Tourist attractions in Suffolk County, New York